The Bonaire Football Federation is the governing body of football in Bonaire. Several iterations of the federation were made and disbanded before the modern federation were founded in 1960.

They became affiliated to CONCACAF as an Associate Member on 19 April 2013. On 10 June 2014, Bonaire became a full member of CONCACAF.

References

External links
Official website
CONCACAF Profile

Sports organizations established in 1960
CONCACAF member associations
1960 establishments in Bonaire